The Pine River is a  river in the north-central Interior of British Columbia, Canada, rising in the Pine Pass in the Misinchinka Ranges on the north side of Azu Mountain and flowing northeast to join the Peace River.

Tributaries 
From source to mounth: Wolf Creek, Beaver Creek, Kathleen Creek, John Bennett Creek, Garbitt Creek, Callazon Creek, Link Creek, Silver Sands Creek, Mountain Creek, Cairns Creek, Lemoray Creek, Big Boulder Creek, Cleveland Creek, Fisher Creek, Beaudette Creek, Falling Creek, Willow Creek, Crassiar Creek, Fred Nelson Creek, Browns Creek, Fur Thief Creek, Rocket Creek, Ivorline Creek, Hasler Creek, Bowlder Creek, Commotion Creek, Young Creek, Stone Creek, Caron Creek, Bisette Creek, Wildmare Creek, Fernando Creek, Centurion Creek, Sukunka River, Stanley Creek, Wabi Creek, Murray River, Wallace Creek, Stewart Creek, Graveyard Creek, Windy Creek.

Hasler Creek 
To access the coal mine, a ferry operated across the Pine River in summer and an ice bridge existed in the winter. Trucks hauled the coal to Dawson Creek. In December 1944, a bridge replaced the ferry at this second crossing of the Pine off BC Highway 97 (Hart Highway). Prior to the completion of the highway bridge at East Pine in 1947, trucking was limited to the winter months because the ferry at that point was unsuitable for loaded coal trucks.

References 

Rivers of the Canadian Rockies